Suedehead: The Best of Morrissey is a compilation album by English singer Morrissey, released on 8 September 1997. It contains material released during Morrissey's EMI period.

Content
The album's material ranges from 1988's Viva Hate to his 1994's Vauxhall and I album, also containing his 1995 non-album singles "Boxers" and "Sunny". Although Suedehead predominantly contains singles, it also has several rarities including "Pregnant for the Last Time", a cover of "That's Entertainment" originally by The Jam and the complete version of "Interlude", a duet with Siouxsie of Siouxsie and the Banshees. It has since been deleted from the EMI catalogue as of 14 December 2010 alongside Beethoven Was Deaf and World of Morrissey.

Track listing
"Suedehead" – 3:56
"Sunny" – 2:44
"Boxers" – 3:30
"Tomorrow" (album version) – 4:04
"Interlude" (featuring Siouxsie) – 5:48
"Everyday Is Like Sunday" – 3:34
"That's Entertainment" (The Jam cover) – 3:57
"Hold On to Your Friends" – 4:03
"My Love Life" – 4:26
"Interesting Drug" – 3:27
"Our Frank" – 3:26
"Piccadilly Palare" – 3:25
"Ouija Board, Ouija Board" – 4:25
"You're the One for Me, Fatty" – 3:00
"We Hate It When Our Friends Become Successful" – 2:30
"The Last of the Famous International Playboys" – 3:39
"Pregnant for the Last Time" – 2:41
"November Spawned a Monster" – 5:25
"The More You Ignore Me, the Closer I Get" – 3:43

Charts

References

Morrissey compilation albums
1997 greatest hits albums
Parlophone compilation albums